The Detroit Diesel 149 is a series of two-stroke diesel engines manufactured by Detroit Diesel which were first announced in early 1966. After Detroit Diesel was spun off in 1988 and later acquired by MTU, production of Series 149 engines was discontinued around 2000.

Development
The first configuration was announced at the 50th anniversary SAE Tractor meeting. As manufacturers in the marine, construction, mining, and many other industries required more power output, Detroit added turbocharging and intercooling to the engine.

As originally designed, the Oliver Hazard Perry-class frigates were equipped with 16V-149TI diesels for electrical generation, but these were replaced starting in 2000 after the Series 149 went out of production. In 1992, Republic Locomotive announced a new line of locomotives powered by Series 149 engines intended for switching and commuter service.

Over a period of time, Detroit Diesel continued to further evolve the design of the engine. Much of this increase in power could be attributed to DDEC III (the third generation of Detroit Diesel Electronic Controls) electronics, thermal barrier (ceramic) coating of piston domes & fire deck, by-pass valve controlled blowers and Separate  Circuit Charge Cooling (SCCC) system.

Design
One of the unique features of the 149 engine is its bore and stroke ; hence, it is known as a square bore design. It has a relatively high power-to-weight ratio.

All Series 149 engines have overhead camshafts and the cylinder heads fit into the engine block; this is referred to as the "pothead" design.  The blowers are also recessed into the block; this section of the block is called the "airbox". Above the blower is a thick piece of steel that covers the blower and seals the top section of the air box. On a turbocharged engine an intercooler and sometimes a by-pass housing is present with the intercooler housing.

Nomenclature
The engine is available in V-8, V-12, V-16, and V-20 configurations; using the alphanumeric nomenclature utilized by Detroit Diesel, these engines were known as the 8V149, 12V149, 16V149, and 20V149, respectively. The first number indicates the number of cylinders per engine, the "V" indicates a V-type cylinder arrangement, and the last set of numbers indicates the series of the engine. Suffixes are commonplace with Detroit Diesel model designations: "T" means the engine is equipped with turbochargers, "I" for intercoolers, and "B" for by-pass Roots-type blowers. For example, the 20V149 TIB has 20 cylinders in a V-type configuration, is a Series 149 engine, and is turbocharged, intercooled, and has by-pass blowers.

Specific models
The 12V and 16V configurations have two blocks, two crankshafts bolted together, two blowers, and four turbos. The 16V149 has dual  exhaust outlets with eight bolt flanges.

The 20V configuration was mainly designed for haul trucks. Detroit could push the envelope of the 16V (in the marine version it could produce  @ 2100 RPM) but it would require special parts. They wanted  with standard production parts, so the 20V149 was born. It has 3 engine blocks, 3 crankshafts bolted together. The unique set up of the 20V has a 6V block on either end of a special 8V block with 6 turbos, 3 blowers and intercoolers.

End of production
Production of Series 149 engines was phased out by mid-1999 and MTU Friedrichshafen's 4000 series of four-stroke diesel engines was proposed as helping to fill the void left by the cessation of the 149 Series production. Detroit Diesel and MTU jointly developed the 2000 and 4000 series, with Detroit Diesel leading development of the 2000 and MTU leading the 4000, each of which are named for the per-cylinder displacement in cm3. Like the Series 149, the 4000 comes in 8V-, 12V-, 16V-, and 20V- configurations. Remanufactured Series 149 long blocks are available for off-highway use.

References

External links

149
Two-stroke diesel engines